The 2010 Heineken Open was a tennis tournament played on outdoor hard courts. It was the 35th edition of the Heineken Open, and was part of the ATP World Tour 250 series of the 2010 ATP World Tour. It took place at the ASB Tennis Centre in Auckland, New Zealand, from 11 January through 16 January 2010. Unseeded John Isner won the singles title.

ATP entrants

Seeds

 as of January 4, 2010

Other entrants
The following players received wildcards into the singles main draw:
  Sébastien Grosjean
  Daniel King-Turner
  Jose Statham

The following players received entry into the singles main draw through qualifying:
  Daniel Evans
  Michael Lammer
  James Lemke
  Paolo Lorenzi

The following player received the lucky loser spot:
  Iñigo Cervantes-Huegun

Finals

Singles

 John Isner defeated  Arnaud Clément, 6–3, 5–7, 7–6(7–2).
 It was Isner's first singles title of his career.

Doubles

 Marcus Daniell /  Horia Tecău defeated   Marcelo Melo /  Bruno Soares, 7–5, 6–4.

See also
 2010 ASB Classic – women's tournament

References

External links
 Official website
 ATP – tournament profile

 
Heineken Open
ATP Auckland Open
Hein
January 2010 sports events in New Zealand